Anders Gaasland, formerly Anders Gåsland (born 16 January 1968) is a Norwegian politician, formerly for the Christian Democratic Party. Openly homosexual, he is considered an important promoter of gay rights in Norway.

Life 
He was born in Rælingen. In 1992, he took over as chairman of the Youth of the Christian People's Party, the youth wing of the Christian Democratic Party. In the autumn of 1992 he came forward as a homosexual, in the prime time news programme Lørdagsrevyen. Shortly after, he was removed from the party ticket for the 1993 Norwegian parliamentary election. Originally willing to continue as chairman of the Youth of the Christian People's Party, he was pressured to resign from this position. He was succeeded by Andreas E. Eidsaa.

Gåsland has later joined the Liberal Party. He was included on the party ticket in Oslo ahead of the 2001 parliamentary election, but was not elected. He works as a psychiatrist.

In 1993, he published the autobiographical book Alltid freidig which details his experience as a gay person in the Christian Democratic Party.

References

1968 births
Living people
Christian Democratic Party (Norway) politicians
Akershus politicians
Gay politicians
Norwegian psychiatrists
Norwegian LGBT politicians
Norwegian autobiographers
LGBT memoirists
People from Rælingen
21st-century LGBT people
LGBT conservatism